Vaalmiki is a 2009 Indian Tamil-language film directed by G. Anantha Narayanan, starring Akhil, Meera Nandan and Devika.

Plot
Vaalmiki is the story of a petty thief, popularly known as Pickpocket Pandi. He does all the petty crimes for a living and he never regrets to steal, snatch and even rob. He is happy on his life leading a fairly happy-go-lucky lifestyle in the company of his friends. His antics always land him in prison. One day he meets a girl, Vandana, a well behaved, sweet-tempered girl. They find themselves attracted to each other even though they have a very little in common. A flower-seller Kanaka, forms the third angle. Whether Vandana reforms Pandi form the climax.

Cast
Akhil as Pandi
Meera Nandan as Vandana
Devika as Kanaka
Karunas

Soundtrack

The music was composed by Ilaiyaraaja.

Release 
The Times of India gave the film two out of five stars and wrote that "If only the director had gone the extra mile, the film would have been even more enjoyable".

References

External links
 

2000 films
2009 films
Films scored by Ilaiyaraaja
2000s Tamil-language films